Georg Wetzell (5 March 1869 - 3 January 1947) was a German General of the Infantry and from 1925 to 1927 chief of the  (troop office) of the .

Biography
As such, he was transferred to the Pioneer Battalion No. 20, also stationed in Metz, on 1 October 1893, and attended the Unified Artillery and Engineering School for further training. From 1901 to 1903 Wetzell attended the Prussian Staff College and was then assigned to the General Staff.

There he remained after the outbreak of World War I and from 9 March 1915 he served as the chief of staff of the III Army Corps. In this role he was responsible for planning several major German offensives of the war.

In 1917 he worked closely with Erich Ludendorff who in his position as First Quartermaster General directed the German war effort. Wetzell was responsible for developing the plan for the Battle of Caporetto which resulted in a major victory for the Germans and their Austro-Hungarian allies over the Italians.  For his achievements in planning the campaign against Italy he was awarded the oak leaves for Pour le Mérite on 1 November 1917. 

In October 1917 Wetzell urged Ludendorff to attack in the early spring of 1918, before the American Expeditionary Forces arrived on the Western Front. On 11 November 1917 Wetzell accompanied Ludendorff to the Mons Conference for discussions with Crown Prince Rupprecht of Bavaria, the commander of Army Group A, and Crown Prince Wilhelm of Prussia, the commander of Army Group B, and their respective chiefs of staff, von Kuhl and von der Schulenburg. Wetzell preferred to attack the French army, considering it the larger and more dangerous enemy. Ludendorff, however, decided to direct the attack against the British Expeditionary Force and accordingly ordered the planning for Operation Michael. Wetzell also planned the follow-on offensives, Operation Georgette and Operation Blücher.

At the end of September 1918 Wetzell was appointed Chief of Staff of the 5th Army. In 1920 he was promoted to Colonel (Oberst).

On 31 October 1927 he was retired with the rank of General of the Infantry. After his retirement he founded the military magazine Deutsche Wehr.  

Starting in 1930 Wetzell has worked for four years as a general advisor on military matters to the Chinese government in Nanking (see Sino-German cooperation (1926–1941)). He then worked as editor-in-chief of the newspaper Militär-Wochenblatt from 1 October 1934 until December 1942 when the paper was discontinued. He also worked as the author and editor of many military and political essays.

Bibliography
His works include:
 Von Falkenhayn zu Hindenburg-Ludendorff (1921)
 Der Bündniskrieg (1937)
 Die deutsche Wehrmacht (1939)

Sources
 Karl-Friedrich Hildebrand, Christian Zweng: Die Ritter des Ordens Pour le Mérite der I. Weltkriegs. Band 3: P–Z. Biblio Verlag, Bissendorf 2011, ISBN 3-7648-2586-3, S. 528–530.
 Hanns Möller: Geschichte der Ritter des Ordens pour le mérite im Weltkrieg. Band II: M–Z. Verlag Bernard & Graefe, Berlin 1935, S. 491–493.

References

External links
 
 Georg Wetzell in der Online-Version der Edition Akten der Reichskanzlei. Weimarer Republik
 Nachlass Bundesarchiv N 629

1869 births
1947 deaths
German Army personnel of World War I
Recipients of the Pour le Mérite (military class)
Prussian Army personnel